Red Jones may refer to:

 Red Jones (outfielder) (1911–1974), baseball player with the St. Louis Cardinals
 Red Jones (umpire) (1905–1987), American baseball umpire in the American League
 Creadel "Red" Jones (1940–1994), American soul singer and musician
 Red Jones (American football), college football player